This is an incomplete list of Filipino full-length films, both mainstream and independently produced, released in theaters and cinemas in 2013.

Top ten grossing films

Note

  Box Office Mojo, a reliable third party box office revenue tracker, does not track any revenues earned during any Metro Manila Film Festival editions. So the official figures by film entries during the festival are only estimates taken from any recent updates from credible and reliable sources such as a film's production outfit, or from any news agencies. Also, Metro Manila Development Authority (MMDA) did not release the official gross sales of each of the films. To verify the figures, see individual sources for the references.

Color key

Films
More than a 100 full-length films were released in the Philippines, most of them were independently produced.

January–March

April–June

July–September
Color key

October–December
Color key

Notes

 ^  Film is an independently produced film. 
 ^  July 26 is Ekstra: The Bit Player's festival screening. August 14 is the film's commercial release nationwide.
 ^  All ten Sineng Pambansa films had an extended run from October 11 until October 17, 2013. Previously, the ten films were screened from September 11 to September 17, 2013.

Awards

Local
The following first list shows the Best Picture winners at the four major film awards: FAMAS Awards, Gawad Urian Awards, Luna Awards and Star Awards; and at the three major film festivals: Metro Manila Film Festival, Cinemalaya and Cinema One Originals. The second list shows films with the most awards won from the three major film awards and a breakdown of their total number of awards per award ceremony.

International
The following list shows Filipino films (released in 2013) which were nominated or won awards at international industry-based awards.

See also
 2013 in the Philippines
 List of 2013 box office number-one films in the Philippines

References

Philippines